Edgar Hernandez (or Édgar Hernández, etc.) may refer to:

 Edgar Hernandez, (alleged, but not confirmed) patient zero in the 2009 swine flu pandemic 
Édgar Hernández (racewalker) (born 1977), Mexican race walker
Édgar Hernández Cabrera (born 1982), Mexican footballer
Édgar Hernández Umaña, Guatemalan deputy interior minister, killed with Minister Vinicio Gómez in 2008 
Édgar Adolfo Hernández, Mexican pro footballer (GK) for team, Jaguares de Chiapas
Edgar Hernandez, American P.O.W in 2003 Invasion of Iraq

es:Edgar Hernández